The 1993 European Curling Championships were held from December 6 to 11 at the Sportzentrum in Leukerbad, Switzerland.

Men's

A Tournament

Group A

Playoffs

Women's

Group A

Tiebreaker
 8-4

Playoffs

References

European Curling Championships, 1993
European Curling Championships, 1993
European Curling Championships
Curling competitions in Switzerland
International sports competitions hosted by Switzerland
1993 in European sport
Leukerbad
December 1993 sports events in Europe